The Borden Institute was located in Borden, Indiana.  It was placed on the National Register of Historic Places in 1973 but removed in 1986.  William W. Borden established the school in 1884 to serve the children of local farmers.  The education "was a creative institution of unusual distinction" in the way it prepared its students to teach and to conduct scientific laboratory studies.  Students of the school have said there were very few regulations.

It had an impressive library of 1,500 volumes at its opening, gaining an additional 50-100 every year.  By 1904 the facility had 3,000 books.

The institute closed in 1906.  The building would continue to see educational use until the 1950s.  Even though preservationists succeeded in protecting it for 12 years, the building was condemned in 1978 and later razed due to fears that nearby elementary school children would be hurt if they played on the property.

References

Municipal and Institutes Libraries of Indiana pg. 23–24.

School buildings on the National Register of Historic Places in Indiana
Educational institutions disestablished in 1906
Defunct schools in Indiana
Educational institutions established in 1884
National Register of Historic Places in Clark County, Indiana
Buildings and structures in Clark County, Indiana
1884 establishments in Indiana
Former National Register of Historic Places in Indiana